This list of notable people of University of Mannheim includes faculty, staff, graduates, administrators and former students in the undergraduate program and all graduate programs, and others affiliated with the University of Mannheim.

Business 

 Klaus Diederichs, Head of European Investment Banking at JP Morgan Chase & Co. (2004–2014)
 Claus E. Heinrich, board member of SAP (1996–2009)
 Henning Kagermann, former professor and CEO of SAP (1998–2009)
 Stefan Lippe, CEO of Swiss Re (2009–2012)
 Bruno Sälzer, CEO of Hugo Boss (2002–2008); CEO of Escada (2008–present)
 Jürgen Schreiber, CEO of Edcon Limited and former CEO and President of Shoppers Drug Mart
 Stephan Sturm, Former managing director at Credit Suisse First Boston and CFO of Fresenius (2005–today)
 Hermann Ude, former CEO of DHL Global Forwarding; former board member of Deutsche Post
 Claus Wellenreuther, entrepreneur and co-founder of SAP
 Hans-Peter Wild, CEO and owner of Rudolf WILD GmbH & Co. KG

Economics 
 Werner Abelshauser, economic historian
 Elisabeth Altmann-Gottheiner, economist; first woman to become a university lecturer in Germany
 Irene Bertschek, economist; head of the Research Department Digital Economy at the ZEW – Leibniz Centre for European Economic Research in Mannheim; Professor of Economics of Digitalisation at University of Giessen
 Knut Borchardt, economist; former Rector of the University of Mannheim; winner of the Gottfried Wilhelm Leibniz Prize
 Axel Dreher, economist; Professor of International and Development Politics at the Ruprecht-Karl University of Heidelberg
 Wolfgang Franz, economist, Chairman of the German Council of Economic Experts
 Clemens Fuest, economist, President of ZEW; former professor at Said Business School
 Eduard Gaugler, economist and former President of the UMA
 Roman Inderst, economist; winner of the Gottfried Wilhelm Leibniz Prize
 Heinz König, economist and former President of the University of Mannheim
 Christoph M. Schmidt, economist, President of the RWI Essen; member of the German Council of Economic Experts
 Isabel Schnabel, economist, Professor of Financial Economics at the University of Mainz; member of the German Council of Economic Experts
 Horst Siebert, economist and Member of the German Council of Economic Experts, 1990-2003
 Hans-Werner Sinn, economist and President of the Ifo Institute for Economic Research
 Jens Weidmann, economist and President of the Deutsche Bundesbank (2011–present)
 Jürgen Wolters, econometrician; former Professor of Econometrics at the Free University of Berlin
 Gerhard Zeitel, economist; former rector of the University of Mannheim

Academics
 Hans Albert, philosopher
 Jutta Allmendinger, sociologist and President of Social Science Research Center Berlin
 Hubertus von Amelunxen, philosopher, art historian, and curator; Senior Curator at the Canadian Centre for Architecture, Montreal, 2001-2007; president and provost at the European Graduate School, Saas-Fee, 2013-2018
 Hans-Wolfgang Arndt, professor of corporate law; rector of the UMA, 2001-2012
 Norbert Bolz, philosopher; media theorist; professor at the Technical University of Berlin
 Kai Brodersen, ancient historian and classicist at the Faculty of the University of Erfurt
 Winfried Brugger, professor of public law
 Sabine Carey, Chair in Political Science IV
 Heinrich Chantraine, professor of geography; former Rector of the UMA
 Daniel Cremers, professor of computer science and mathematics at the Technical University of Munich
 Noël Martin Joseph de Necker, Belgian physician and botanist
 Thomas Diez, professor of political science and international relations at the Institute for Political Science, University of Tübingen
 Axel Dreher, German Economist, belongs to the IDEAS 500 top economists
 Bernhard Ebbinghaus, sociologist
 Peter Flora, former professor of sociology (1982–2009)
 Wolfgang Franz, German Economist and former Chairman of the German Council of Economic Experts 
 Clemens Fuest, German Economist and Chairman of the ZEW
 Miles Hewstone, psychologist
 Klaus Hildebrand, liberal-conservative historian
 Christian Homburg, professor of marketing
 Kyra T. Inachin, historian
 Roman Inderst, German Economist and Winner of the Gottfried Wilhelm Leibniz Prize
 Juliane Kokott, former professor of law
 Stefan Lucks, researcher in communications security and cryptography
 Thilo Marauhn, lawyer
 Wolfgang Männel, former professor of business administration at the University of Frankfurt and University of Dortmund 
 Friedrich Kasimir Medikus, physician and botanist
 Hans Meuer, professor of computer Science; Chairman of the International Supercomputing Conference
 Christophe Neff, Franco-German geographer; scientist at the Karlsruhe Institute of Technology
 Heinz-Herbert Noll, sociologist
 Jonathan Pool, U.S. political scientist
 Franz Rothenbacher, sociologist
 Christoph M. Schmidt, German Economist and President of the RWI Essen
 Norbert Schwarz, Provost Professor in the Department of Psychology and the Marshall School of Business at the University of Southern California
 Otto Selz, former professor in psychology, philosophy and pedagogy
 Hans-Werner Sinn, German Economist and President of the Ifo Institute for Economic Research
 Ulrich Steinvorth, philosopher
 Rosemarie Tracy, linguist, acquisitionist and Wilhelm von Humboldt Prize awardee
 Hermann Weber, former historian and political scientist
 Joachim Weickert, professor of mathematics and computer science at Saarland University; Gottfried Wilhelm Leibniz Prize Laureate
 Helfrich Bernhard Wenck, German historian
 Ursula Wolf, former professor in Philosophy at the Free University of Berlin and University of Frankfurt
 Wolfgang Zapf, sociologist
 Klaus F. Zimmermann, German economist, professor for economics at the University of Bonn and former President of the DIW Berlin

Politics, civil services and military 
 Alexander Nuno Alvaro, politician
 Franziska Brantner, politician, member of the Bundestag
 Jürgen Creutzmann, politician
 Oskar Dirlewanger, military officer, founder of the infamous Nazi SS penal unit "Dirlewanger" during World War II
 Florian Gerster, politician
 Maciej Golubiewski (born 1976), Polish political scientist and Consul General at the Consulate General of the Republic of Poland in New York City
 Hans-Olaf Henkel, President of the Leibniz Association; candidate of the Alternative for Germany for the 2014 European Parliament election
 Christine Lambrecht, first female Chief Whip of the SPD; member of the Bundestag
 Gaspar Martins, Angolan diplomat and political figure; Angola's Permanent Representative to the United Nations since 2001
 Onésimo Redondo, Spanish Falangist Fascist politician; founder of Juntas Castellanas de Actuación Hispánica (Castilian Groups of Hispanic Action)
 Christian von Stetten, politician, entrepreneur and member of the Bundestag
 Jürgen Walter, politician

Culture, sports and entertainment 
 Christian Baracat, international rugby union player

 Artem Klein, ice hockey player
 Philipp Laux, footballer; psychologist of RB Leipzig
 Alessa Ries, retired swimmer; won a gold medal in the 4 × 200 m Freestyle Relay at the 2002 European Aquatics Championships
 Dieter Roth, Swiss artist

Honorary doctorates
 Richard Blundell, British economist and econometrician
 Hans Leonhard Hammerbacher, former president of DIHK (Association of German Chambers of Industry and Commerce)
 Richard Lenel, former Chairman of the Chamber of Commerce; honorary citizen of the city of Mannheim
 Kurt Lotz, second post-war CEO of Volkswagen
 Hans Carl Nipperdey, German labour law expert; former president of the Federal Labour Court
 Torsten Persson, Swedish economist and Director of the Institute for International Economic Studies at Stockholm University
 Edmund Phelps, American economist; winner of the 2006 Nobel Memorial Prize in Economic Sciences
 Hans Reschke, former Lord Mayor of Mannheim
 Jean Tirole, French professor of economics; winner of the 2014 Nobel Memorial Prize in Economic Sciences

See also 
 University of Mannheim
 Mannheim Business School

References

University of Mannheim
Mannheim